The 2014 Tennessee Volunteers football team represented the University of Tennessee in the 2014 NCAA Division I FBS football season. This was the 118th overall season, 81st as a member of the Southeastern Conference (SEC), and its 23rd within the SEC Eastern Division. The team was coached by Butch Jones in his second season with Tennessee, and played its home games at Neyland Stadium in Knoxville.

The Vols finished the regular season at 6–6, 3–5 in the SEC, making them bowl-eligible for the first time since 2010. On December 7, 2014, it was announced that the Vols would face the Iowa Hawkeyes (7–5) in the TaxSlayer Bowl in Jacksonville, Florida, on January 2, 2015. In that game, the Vols, with Joshua Dobbs leading the team as the quarterback, struck quickly and hammered away at the Hawkeyes to secure a 45–28 win, marking Tennessee's first winning season since 2009. The bowl victory was the Vols' first since 2007.

Previous season
Tennessee came into the 2013 season un-ranked and on a streak of three consecutive losing seasons. 2013 fared no better for the Volunteers under new head coach Butch Jones. The season started with a 45–0 victory over Austin Peay that gave Tennessee its 800th win in school history. Tennessee became only the eighth school to ever win 800 games in football. In week two, the Volunteers beat the WKU Hilltoppers 52–20. In week three, Tennessee was beat by #2 Oregon 59–14 and a 31–17 loss to rival #19 Florida in week 4.

By mid-October, Tennessee was in position to qualify for a bowl game after an upset 23–21 victory over #11 South Carolina, the first win for Tennessee over an AP Top 25 team since 2009, however Tennessee went on a four-game losing skid that included 45–10 loss to #1 Alabama, 31–3 #10 Missouri, homecoming loss to #7 Auburn, and any chance of a bowl game was dashed in a 14–10 loss to in-state rival Vanderbilt. A 27–14 victory over Kentucky in week 14 left Tennessee with a 5–7 record and gave Tennessee its fourth straight seven-loss season.

Before the season
Tennessee has 11 starters returning from the 2013 season. All five starting offensive linemen from last season are gone, as are the top five tacklers from the defensive line.

After missing the 2013 season, outside linebacker Curt Maggitt will be back on the field playing various roles. He led the team in 2012 with five tackles for loss and 2.5 sacks before tearing his ACL, which kept him off the field last season.

Bobby Denton, longtime PA announcer at Neyland Stadium, died on April 9 at the age of 73 after battling cancer for a year. Jeff Jarnigan, the PA announcer for Tennessee's basketball games, was named the new PA announcer for football games on July 17.

Spring practice
Tennessee began Spring football practice on March 7 and played their annual Orange-and-White Game on April 12. They were without star wide receiver Pig Howard for unspecified personal reasons. Reserve defensive lineman Gregory Clark, who was a fifth-year senior, left the team in the offseason to focus on his postgraduate career. Wide receivers Drae Bowles and Ryan Jenkins, tight end Brendan Downs, safety Brian Randolph, and defensive lineman Trevarris Saulsberry did not participate so that they could recover from injuries.

Marlin Lane was expected to be limited on reps through spring practice with a broken bone in his hand and that highly recruited running back Jalen Hurd would see an increased workload. This was not the case however as Lane was carrying most of the first-team reps in practice. Josh Malone, also a highly recruited wide receiver, competed with Jason Croom for the starting spot in the outside receiver slot opposite of Marquez North.

With the graduation of Michael Palardy, Tennessee was in need of a new kicker and punter. Matt Darr is expected to take over as punter. George Bullock is in line to handle kicking.

Defensive tackle Jason Carr and defensive end Malik Brown were both expected to sit out of spring practice for wrist injuries. But Jason returned to practice on April 2 while Malik remained sidelined. Coach Jones considered moving Jason Carr from defensive tackle to offensive tackle.

The battle for the starting spot at quarterback showed no clear frontrunners through most of spring practice. Justin Worley, who won the starting job last August, lost his starting spot against Florida in week 4 (he ended up subbing in for Nathan Peterman). After being knocked out of the week 8 game against Alabama, then redshirted freshman Joshua Dobbs took over the starting role for the rest of the 2013 season. In the final week of practice, Worley and Ferguson emerged as the frontrunners for the starting job. Justin Worley is most likely to retake the starting spot at quarterback.

Senior cornerback Justin Coleman played the nickel back role this spring and is expected to lineup as the fifth defensive back this season.

Coach Jones challenged his 'soft' defense to toughen up during spring practice along with reiterating themes of "fundamental improvement" and "competing all day".

Devrin Young, after playing a season as slot receiver, returned to the running back position during spring practice.

Spring game
Tennessee played the Orange and White Game on April 12. Coach Butch Jones said that the offense had made great strides from where they started at the beginning of spring practice. Jones, however, made note that the defense was still deficient overall.

In his first action since tearing his ACL in 2012, Curt Maggitt finished the game with three tackles and one sack. He played defensive end in nickel situations and at outside linebacker during base packages.

Jalen Hurd, highly recruited running back, got a chance to show his ability when he carried the ball for 66 yards rushing and one touchdown carry. He also caught a pass for 27 yards. "Jalen has been pretty much doing that all spring", Jones said. "You can see he adds a whole other dynamic to our offense. I said it in the offseason: We have to be able to throw a 5-yard pass and turn it into a 20-yard gain. That was missing from our offense last year, and we've really helped ourselves in recruiting. Jalen has been an individual that, right from practice one, he can be as good as he wants to be."

Jalen Reeves-Maybin finished second on the team with seven tackles and 0.5 tackles for loss at outside linebacker.

Joshua Dobbs, who started the final four games last season in place of Justin Worley, was not in contention for the starting job at QB. He completed six passes for 199 yards and three touchdowns and took a low, bounced snap off the ground and rumbled 59 yards for another touchdown. "Josh has had a productive spring, but I thought he really stepped it up today", coach Butch Jones said. Though all that action came against mostly reserves, Dobbs' had noticeable muscle gain and sheer arm strength on deep balls.

Justin Worley, who is expected to be the starting quarterback when the season starts, finished the game 11–13 and 151 yards passing along with one touchdown. He also had 55 yards rushing on two carries.

Marquez North makes up one of many impressive wide receivers playing for Tennessee this season. He finished the game with 106 yards receiving and a 50-yard touchdown reception.

Josh Malone showed why he was so coveted as a recruit with 181 yards receiving on six catches and three touchdowns. The longest of which he took 79 yards to the end zone. The Gallatin, Tenn. standout pass-catcher had been improving throughout the spring and dominated defenders when he got the ball.

In 2013, Tennessee finished 11th in total defense in the SEC (418.4 YPG) and the spring game showed that the defense was dealing with the same problems such as tackling. This was something that Butch Jones had spent a chunk of time during spring practice to work on.

Post spring practice
On April 22, reserve running back Alden Hill announced that he was leaving the team. "As of today I am I’m sad to say I am no longer a Tennessee Vol. I have decided to move on for my best interest and find a new home. I have loved Tennessee and the entire Big Orange family. I thank the coaches and the fans for my time here and will always remember my time spent at Tennessee, my first true love," Alden said via his Instagram account. He tweeted a link to the post. Although his Twitter account is unverified, head coach Butch Jones confirmed that Hill had left the team and was looking to transfer to another school.

On April 30, fifth-year defensive back JaRon Toney announced that he was leaving the team. Coach Jones said Toney would graduate in the summer and planned to pursue his professional non-football career. "I'm very excited for him getting his college degree, and I'm very appreciative of everything he's done for Tennessee", Jones said Wednesday.

On May 6, lineman Jason Carr announced that he was leaving the program and transferring to another school. Carr played defensive tackle last season for the Vols but was moved to offensive tackle after this spring and was expected to practice at that position this summer.

In a May 14 interview with the Chattanooga Times Free Press, coach Jones told Patrick Brown that Pig Howard, who didn't participate in spring practice for unspecified personal reasons, would be back with the team for the team's summer workout program on the condition of meeting school requirements. "He's in here in mini-term, so he's here", Jones said. "When we start our official summer strength and conditioning program he will be a part of it. He still has certain stipulations and requirements that must be met for him. It'll be ongoing throughout the summer months. A lot of it is laid out upon our player staff, but up until this point in time right now, he's done everything that's been required of him." On July 15, Butch Jones announced that Pig Howard was officially back on the team.

On May 27, Riley Ferguson announced that he would transfer to another school according to coach Jones. "As of right now, based on our recent conversations, we do not anticipate that he will be a member of our football family moving forward," Jones said. He was expected to battle Justin Worley and sophomore Joshua Dobbs for the starting spot throughout summer and into fall after redshirting last season following a stress fracture in his right leg. "I'm not sure how much this helps or hurts Tennessee", GoVols247's Wes Rucker said in an interview with Bleacher Report. "I think Ferguson had the most upside of Tennessee's four quarterbacks, but he was arguably the least consistent. "I thought before this came out that Justin Worley was the starter going into the season, and obviously, this news doesn't change that. I think this potentially creates more long-term questions than short-term questions."

Summer months
On June 2, coach Jones confirmed that redshirt freshman Malik Brown would transfer from Tennessee.

Incoming freshman Charles Mosley suffered a broken leg in a July 6 car crash. He was traveling back to the university campus with family at the time. He underwent tibia surgery later that night. Mosley was in good condition following the surgery according to associate athletic director Jimmy Stanton. However, coach Jones announced that he would miss the season as a result of his injuries. "We don't anticipate him being back for this year", Jones said following UT's second preseason practice Saturday at Haslam Field."He's been back since reporting day, so he's getting the rehabilitation that he needs", Jones said. "He's still around the meetings, so it's great because, again, he's another Von Pearson. He's always up. He's always positive. And to be able to have him around our team is very, very good — good for him and good for the team, as well."

On July 7, the Maxwell Football Club released an official list of college football players who are considered frontrunners for the annual Chuck Bednarik Award, given to the best defensive player. Tennessee linebacker A. J. Johnson was named to the list. Johnson was also named to the watch list for the Bronko Nagurski Trophy, which is also given to the best defensive player, the Butkus Award that's given to the top linebacker and the Rotary Lombardi Award that's given to the best lineman or linebacker.

SEC Media Days
On day two of SEC Media Days, Butch Jones took the podium to make it clear that his team is very optimistic about the upcoming season. "Obviously, it's an exciting time of year right now," Butch Jones said Tuesday. "Everyone starts at 0-0." He also noted that no teams are ever alike when comparing the current squad to the previous season's squad and that Tennessee has had enough of losing. "I think the whole dynamic of our football program has changed," Jones said. "From a work capacity, from a mentality, from a passion to represent the University of Tennessee, we had some great seniors last year and are very indebted to them, but overall as an organization, losing is a disease. We’ve been sick, we’ve been ill, and we’re working to get over those ills. This football team has worked exceptionally hard, and they have a great competitive component about them." A. J. Johnson also took the podium on day two. "I know we’re going to turn it around," senior linebacker A.J. Johnson said. "We were a couple plays away, a couple inches away last year. We’re going to better ourselves this season, so it's going to turn around. I didn’t come back for my senior season to not win." When asked how Tennessee plans to replace interior lines and how the highly touted freshman class will respond, coach Jones said that the great thing about the SEC is that it's so talented and anybody is capable of winning.

On day four of SEC Media Days, senior linebacker A. J. Johnson was named to the Preseason All-SEC First Team and sophomore wide receiver Marquez North was named to the Preseason All-SEC Third Team. Tennessee was picked to finish fifth in the SEC Eastern Division while South Carolina was picked to win the East.

Fall camp
Tennessee opened its preseason fall camp on July 31 with a preseason media session and began practice on August 1. "We have to get a lot of players ready to play for the first time," Butch Jones said. "We have a lot of questions. We have a lot of untested positions and individuals in our football program. We have to test them each and every day both mentally and physically."

Junior wide receiver Cody Blanc suffered an injury in the Vols opening practice of fall camp on August 1. "We don't know (what he injured)", Coach Jones said. "It may be his ankle, maybe Achilles tendon. We're kind of waiting right now." On August 5, Coach Jones announced that Cody Blanc would be out the entire season after tearing his Achilles tendon.

On August 4, Coach Jones announced that freshman Jashon Robertson would move from defensive tackle to offensive guard.

In an interview with Ryan Callahan, Coach Jones spoke about the test of week 1. "They’re being challenged—not only on the field, but, again, this being the final week of classes, so they have papers due. They have final examinations coming up. So I think it's just a combination of a lot of things, but I was very pleased in the way they fought through it today. But (it's) not fighting through it. It's more in how you attack the day, and I thought that they attacked the day exceptionally well." The first week showed no clear front-runner for the starting QB job. In fact, it brought a lot of all too familiar problems to the surface such as inconsistency and timing. "I need much more consistency at the quarterback position right now", Bajakian said. The freshman who are here to bring Tennessee back to prominence did show great signs in the first week. "It's gonna be a slow process", Utah freshman safety Todd Kelly Jr. told GoVols247's Wes Rucker. "It's a learning process. We just got here. We've only been here for about a month and a half. Ultimately we just want to make this program [a] better place."

On August 14, Coach Jones announced that Justin Worley would be the starting quarterback.

After the second week of fall camp, Daniel Helm and Ethan Wolf emerged as the leading contenders for the starting role at tight end. Highly touted freshman wide receiver Josh Malone, who had struggled in the first week of practice, showed dramatic improvement in the team's second full scrimmage. "I'm proud of Josh Malone", Coach Jones said. "He's been fighting through things and he took big steps tonight." While Curt Maggitt was hobbled by a minor leg injury, freshman Derek Barnett got rave reviews from the coaches while practicing with the first team in Maggitt's place. No decision has been made on who will be the starting kicker according to Coach Jones.

After the final week of fall camp, Coach Jones made it clear that the young team is a work in progress on maturity and mentality. "We're still work-in-progress from the maturity standpoint. Like I said, some individuals are ahead of others in terms of maturity. We knew this. This isn't any surprise to us. They're 17-year-old kids going through their first training camp. It's having that mental toughness, mental conditioning to fight through the fatigue, especially the mental fatigue. We talk about being relentless and having a relentless approach. But the mental approach is so much more important than the physical approach. … We're very, very youthful. So every day is a learning experience for them." Despite a re-aggravated knee injury, Trevarris Saulsberry won't be out for the season as was initially feared. Coach Jones said he would be out for a few days at most.

Personnel
Tennessee Head Coach Butch Jones will enter his second year as the Volunteers' head coach for the 2014 season. In his first season last year, he led the Vols to a 5-7 record that included wins over #11 South Carolina and Austin Peay that gave Tennessee its 800th win in school history. Tennessee also retains its entire coaching staff from 2013 for the first time since 2007.

Roster & staff

2014 recruiting class
Tennessee's 2014 recruiting class was ranked the fifth-best overall 2014 class by both Rivals.com and ESPN, fourth-best by Scout.com, and seventh-best by 247Sports.com.  The Vols' 2014 class is known as the "legacy class" for its unusually large number of legacies, including Todd Kelly, Jr. (son of Todd Kelly), Dillon Bates (son of Bill Bates), twins Elliott and Evan Berry (sons of former Vol running back James Berry and brothers of All-American safety Eric Berry), Neiko Creamer (son of former Vol defensive back Andre Creamer), and Vic Wharton (nephew of former Tennessee basketball player Brandon Wharton).  Isaiah McDaniel, the son of former Vol cornerback Terry McDaniel, joined the squad as a preferred walk-on. Will Bradshaw and Devin Smith, who were both standout quarterbacks at their respective East Tennessee high schools, joined the team July 10 as walk-ons.

Returning starters

Offense

Defense

Special teams

Depth chart

* This depth chart is the official lineup for week six.

Schedule
The 2014 schedule was officially released on August 21, 2013. Tennessee will face all six Eastern Division opponents: Florida, Georgia, Kentucky, Missouri, South Carolina, and Vanderbilt. They will also face two Western Division opponents: official SEC rival Alabama and Ole Miss. Tennessee is not scheduled to play SEC opponents Arkansas, Auburn, LSU, Mississippi State, or Texas A&M. They are also scheduled to play four non-conference games: Oklahoma of the Big 12 Conference, Utah State of the Mountain West Conference, Chattanooga of the Southern Conference in the FCS, and Arkansas State of the Sun Belt Conference.

In his College Football Preview in March 2014, football analyst Phil Steele pointed out that, according to the NCAA method, Tennessee's 2014 schedule would be the nation's third toughest, behind the schedules of Arkansas and Virginia. His own ranking of the nation's toughest schedules has yet to be released.

Schedule source

Game summaries

Utah State

In their first ever matchup on the gridiron, Tennessee opened the season with a 38–7 win over Utah State. Justin Worley threw for 273 yards and 3 touchdowns. "I didn't have the nerves I've had in the past", Worley said. "It goes back to my confidence level, the confidence I have in these guys, the confidence I have in the offensive scheme and everything. This being the second year (as a starter), my confidence is a lot higher. I tried to go out there and play like that."

Starting left tackle Jacob Gilliam suffered a torn ACL. "It's very very unfortunate," Butch Jones said of Gilliam's injury. "I feel for him and his family. He's a young man that– I love him to death. A walk-on who earned his scholarship, he earned it. It's very very unfortunate but that's football and we’ll need to have the next guy in. But I just feel for Jacob just because he's earned the respect of his peers and put himself in the position to be our starting left tackle."

Arkansas State

Tennessee improved their overall record against Sun Belt Conference teams to 8–0 with a 34–19 win over Arkansas State. This was the fourth straight year Tennessee started a season 2–0. Despite trailing for the first time this season, Tennessee took control of the ball game at the tail-end of the first quarter and Arkansas State wasn't able to fight back.

Von Pearson suffered a high ankle sprain in this game and didn't play against Oklahoma.

#4 Oklahoma

In the first road game of the season, Tennessee suffered its first loss of the season at the hands of the fourth ranked Oklahoma Sooners. The young offensive line was overwhelmed the whole night by the much more experienced Sooner defense as they sacked Justin Worley five times (not including one that was negated by a face mask penalty), intercepted two balls in the end zone, including one that was returned 100 yards for a touchdown, and recovered a fumble. "We improved in some areas, but when you go on the road against a quality opponent like Oklahoma you can't turn the football over", Butch Jones said. "A game can come down to two or three plays and you never know which plays are going to make a difference."

During the time between Oklahoma and Georgia, Coach Jones announced that freshman running back Treyvon Paulk had been dismissed from the team for a "personal conduct" issue. He did not elaborate further.

#12 Georgia

In their first SEC game of the 2014 season, Tennessee fell short of upsetting a ranked Georgia team for the third consecutive year. The defense kept the Vols in the game, but inconsistent drives and failing to capitalize on two interceptions prevented them from taking control of the game. Heisman candidate Todd Gurley ran for a career-high 217 yards and scored two touchdowns. Ultimately, a fumble in the end zone recovered by Josh Dawson is what sealed the game for the Bulldogs.

Florida

In front of a sold-out crowd of over 100-thousand fans which wore color-coordinated shirts to create an orange-and-white checkerboarded Neyland Stadium, the Tennessee Volunteers allowed ten unanswered points in the fourth quarter and fell to the Florida Gators for the tenth consecutive season. The Volunteers had a 9–0 lead at the start of the fourth until Matt Jones scored the first touchdown of the game with 13 minutes and 40 seconds left in the game. Austin Hardin scored a controversial game-winning field goal after time had expired on the play clock that was not called back. Justin Worley was driving the team down the field when he threw a costly interception that was picked off by Keanu Neal.

Chattanooga

In the sixth game of the season, Tennessee ended a three-game losing skid with a 45–10 victory over Chattanooga. The two programs were meeting for the first time in 45 years, since a Mocs victory in 1969. Justin Worley completed 79% of his passes for 198 yards and three touchdowns. The team combined for 123 rushing yards and 217 receiving yards. Worley became the first Tennessee quarterback to rush for two touchdowns in a game since Casey Clausen in a 45–17 Florida Citrus Bowl triumph over Michigan on January 1, 2002.

#3 Ole Miss

In their third SEC game of the 2014 season, Tennessee had its lowest offensive production of the season in a 34 to three loss to the third ranked Ole Miss Rebels. "Turnovers were the story of the game", Tennessee coach Butch Jones said. "We had a lot of negative yardage. When you are 3-for-16 on third-down conversions you are not giving yourself an opportunity to be in the game and win." The Volunteers continued to play excellent on defense. "They're phenomenal", Wallace said. "They're fun to watch. Before the season I knew they were good. I didn't know they were this good. All I have to do is take care of the ball."

#4 Alabama

In the 96th edition of the Third Saturday in October, the Tennessee Volunteers lost to the fourth ranked Alabama Crimson Tide for the eighth consecutive year. The Tide jumped to a 27–0 lead before the Vols scored 17 unanswered points to cut the deficit to ten. But a 28-yard touchdown run by Derrick Henry in the third quarter and an early fourth quarter pick by Joshua Dobbs put a dagger in Tennessee's late rally. They were only able to put up one more field goal to bring the final score to 34–20. Alabama was led by a 224-yard receiving performance by Amari Cooper compared to 56 yards by Tennessee's Marquez North.

South Carolina

In their fifth SEC game of 2014, Tennessee rallied back from a 14-point deficit in the fourth quarter to tie the game and force overtime. Aaron Medley booted home the game-winning field goal on UT's first overtime possession. After two sacks and an incomplete pass, Elliot Fry lined up for a 58-yard field goal that was blocked and gave the Volunteers their first SEC win of the season. Tennessee out-rushed an opponent for the first time this season with a combined 344 rushing yards. Joshua Dobbs accounted for 166 of those yards, establishing the new school record for quarterbacks rushing yards. With this scintillating victory, Tennessee moved into a tie with Missouri for the most all-time overtime victories.

Kentucky

In their sixth SEC game of the 2014 season, Tennessee, behind a 297-yard, three touchdown passing performance from Joshua Dobbs, continued its absolute dominance over their longtime rival Kentucky in a 50–16 blowout victory. For Tennessee, it moved them one game closer to a bowl game. For Kentucky, it was the continuation of a five-game losing skid after a 5–1 start to the season. Dobbs went 19 of 27 for 297 yards and threw two touchdown passes to Von Pearson and one to Jason Croom. Tennessee's Jalen Hurd rushed for 118 yards and a touchdown on 24 carries. Austin MacGinnis kicked three field goals for Kentucky, including a school-record 54-yarder.

#19 Missouri

In their seventh SEC game of the 2014 season, Tennessee celebrated senior day by squaring off with the Missouri Tigers. This was the third meeting between the two Eastern Division schools. Missouri remained the only SEC school that Tennessee has never defeated in football, with a 29–21 win.  The Vols were missing leading tackler A.J. Johnson and cornerback Michael Williams, who were suspended from all team-related activities, as both were named as subjects of an ongoing rape investigation. The Vols also didn't have injured center Mack Crowder and receiver Marquez North. Safety Brian Randolph committed a targeting penalty in the previous game and had to sit out the first half. The absences forced Coach Butch Jones to start seven true freshmen, something never done before in a Tennessee game. The Vols recovered an onside kick with less than two minutes remaining in the game, but it was ruled Missouri ball since it didn't go ten yards. After reviewing the play, a Missouri player had touched the ball before it went ten yards making it a live ball which Tennessee recovered. However, referee Matt Austin also ruled that Tennessee had been offsides on the kick and had to re-kick it. Tennessee recovered the ball on the re-kick, but Justin Coleman touched the ball before it went ten yards, so Missouri took over and won the game.

Vanderbilt

In their 12th and final game of the 2014 season, Tennessee headed west on I-40 to Nashville to face their in-state rival, the Vanderbilt Commodores. This was the 108th meeting between these two bitter Eastern Division rivals. Before the game, Tennessee led the all-time series 73–29–5 against Vandy. The Vols won the game, 24–17, making them bowl eligible for the first time since 2010. Joshua Dobbs ran for two touchdowns and 91 yards as Tennessee also snapped a two-game skid to Vandy that had been their longest in this series since the 1925–26 season.

Iowa

Sophomore quarterback Joshua Dobbs accounted for three touchdowns–one passing, two rushing–in the Tennessee Volunteers' 45–28 win over the Iowa Hawkeyes in the  2015 TaxSlayer Bowl. Freshman running back Jalen Hurd had his fourth 100-yard game of the season, finishing with 122 yards and two touchdowns.

Team statistics

References

Tennessee
Tennessee Volunteers football seasons
Gator Bowl champion seasons
Tennessee Volunteers football